People for Democracy and Justice (Russian: Народ за демократию и справедливость [НДС]) is a Russian political party, established in 2007. The party leader is former Russian Prime Minister Mikhail Kasyanov.

Kasyanov's new party was established on 22 September 2007, when he was elected party chairman by 228 votes to 4. Delegates from 57 Russian regions worked on the founding congress.

See also
Dissenters' March
The Other Russia (coalition)
United Civil Front
Mikhail Kasyanov
Yabloko
People's Freedom Party (Russia)

External links
Official party site
Mikhail Kasyanov's official site

2007 establishments in Russia
Alliance of Liberals and Democrats for Europe Party member parties
Liberal parties in Russia
Political parties established in 2007

ru:Российский народно-демократический союз